Charles Fletcher Johnson (February 14, 1859 – February 15, 1930) was a United States senator from Maine and a United States circuit judge of the United States Court of Appeals for the First Circuit.

Johnson was nominated by President Woodrow Wilson on October 1, 1917, to a seat vacated by William LeBaron Putnam. He was confirmed by the United States Senate on October 1, 1917, and received commission the same day. Assumed senior status on April 30, 1929. Johnson's service was terminated on February 15, 1930, due to death.

Education and career

Born on February 14, 1859, in Winslow, Kennebec County, Maine, Johnson attended the common schools and Waterville Classical Institute. He received an Artium Baccalaureus degree in 1879 from Bowdoin College and read law in 1886. He was principal of the high school of Machias, Washington County, Maine from 1881 to 1886. He was admitted to the bar and entered private practice in Waterville, Maine from 1886 to 1911. He was an unsuccessful candidate for Governor of Maine in 1892 and 1894. He was elected Mayor of Waterville in 1893, but left that office in 1894. He was a member of the Maine House of Representatives in 1905 and 1907.

Congressional service

Johnson was elected as a Democrat to the United States Senate in 1910 and served from March 4, 1911, until March 3, 1917. He was an unsuccessful candidate for reelection in 1916. He was Chairman of the Committee on National Banks (63rd United States Congress), Committee on Fisheries (64th United States Congress) and the Committee on Pensions (64th United States Congress).

Federal judicial service

Johnson was nominated by President Woodrow Wilson on October 1, 1917, to a seat on the United States Court of Appeals for the First Circuit vacated by Judge William LeBaron Putnam. He was confirmed by the United States Senate on October 1, 1917, and received his commission the same day. He assumed senior status on April 30, 1929. His service terminated on February 15, 1930, due to his death while on a visit to St. Petersburg, Florida. He was interred in Pine Grove Cemetery in Waterville.

References

Sources
 
 

Bowdoin College alumni
1859 births
1930 deaths
Democratic Party members of the Maine House of Representatives
Democratic Party United States senators from Maine
Judges of the United States Court of Appeals for the First Circuit
Mayors of Waterville, Maine
United States court of appeals judges appointed by Woodrow Wilson
20th-century American judges
People from Winslow, Maine